The Little Cities of Black Diamonds are the historic coal town mining communities of the Appalachia region in southeast Ohio.

Communities
Some Black Diamonds communities include:

Buchtel, Ohio
Carbondale, Ohio
Carbon Hill, Ohio
Corning, Ohio
Diamond, Ohio
Glouster, Ohio
Hemlock, Ohio
Murray City, Ohio
Nelsonville, Ohio
New Straitsville, Ohio
Shawnee, Perry County, Ohio
Trimble, Ohio

Culture
Sunday Creek Associates, a nonprofit organization located in Shawnee, Ohio. It is responsible for a community building experience named "Little Cities of Black Diamonds."  It includes organizing local history bus tours, the Little Cities of the Forest, the Little Cities Archives, the Little Cities of Black Diamonds Day, and the Appalachian Spring Festival.

See also

External links
 Official Little Cities of Black Diamonds website
 Little Cities of the Forest Website
 Little Cities Archive Website

.
Appalachian culture in Ohio
Coal mining in Appalachia
Populated places in Ohio
Regions of Ohio
Ohio culture